The Acura ARX-06 is a sports prototype racing car designed by Honda Performance Development and built by Oreca. It is designed to the Le Mans Daytona h regulations, and will compete in the GTP class in the IMSA SportsCar Championship. The ARX-06 debuted alongside the BMW M Hybrid V8, Cadillac V-LMDh and Porsche 963 at the 2023 season opener of the IMSA SportsCar Championship at the Daytona International Speedway.

Racing results

Complete IMSA SportsCar Championship results
(key) Races in bold indicates pole position. Races in italics indicates fastest lap.

* Season still in progress.

References

Acura vehicles
IMSA GTP cars
Hybrid electric cars
Sports prototypes
Le Mans Daytona h cars